Mycophila is a genus of wood midges, insects in the family Cecidomyiidae. There are seven described species in Mycophila. The genus was establish by Ephraim Porter Felt in 1911.

Species
 Mycophila echinoidea Bu & Mo, 1996
 Mycophila fungicola Felt, 1911
 Mycophila indica Nayar, 1949
 Mycophila lampra Pritchard, 1947
 Mycophila longispina Bu & Mo, 1996
 Mycophila nikoleii Möhn, 1960
 Mycophila speyeri (Barnes, 1926)

References

Further reading

 
 

Articles created by Qbugbot
Cecidomyiidae genera

Taxa named by Ephraim Porter Felt
Insects described in 1911